Martín Fernández may refer to:
 Martín Fernández (footballer, born 2001), Uruguayan football midfielder
 Martín Fernández (footballer, born 2003), Uruguayan football midfielder
 Martín Fernández de Angulo Saavedra y Luna (died 1516), Roman Catholic prelate
 Martín Fernández de Enciso (c. 1470–1528), Spanish lawyer, colonial official and geographer
 Martín Fernández de Navarrete (1765–1844), Spanish noble, politician and historian
 Martín Fernández de Vilches (died 1469), Roman Catholic prelate